Lukas Biewald (born 1981 in Massachusetts) is an entrepreneur living in San Francisco, California. Biewald was the founder and CEO of Figure Eight Inc. (formerly CrowdFlower) — an Internet company that collects training data for machine learning — which he co-founded in December 2007 with Chris Van Pelt.  In 2019, Biewald sold Figure Eight to Appen for 300 million dollars.

In 2018, Biewald founded Weights and Biases, a company that creates developer tools for machine learning.

Background 
Prior to co-founding Figure Eight, Biewald was a Senior Scientist and Manager within the Ranking and Management Team at Powerset, a natural language search technology company later acquired by Microsoft.

From 2005 to 2006, Biewald led the Search Relevance Team for Yahoo! Japan, where he focused on using statistical machine learning approaches to improve the web search ranking function for international markets.

Awards and honors 

In 2010, he won the Netexplorateur Prize for creating the GiveWork iPhone app, which allows users to perform small tasks that assist refugees and people in developing countries. Later that year, Inc. Magazine included Biewald and Van Pelt on its list of the Top 30 Entrepreneurs Under 30.

Biewald and Van Pelt launched CrowdFlower as a product of Dolores Labs at TechCrunch50 in 2009, where the company placed as a finalist.

He is the author of several academic papers  on applications of crowdsourcing, as well as a chapter on crowdsourcing gender and age stereotypes in O'Reilly Media's Beautiful Data that he co-authored with Brendan O'Connor.

Academic life 

Biewald holds an MS in Computer Science and a BS in Mathematics from Stanford University.

While pursuing his Master's in Computer Science at Stanford University, Biewald won the California Institute of Technology Turing Tournament.

Media appearances 

Biewald appeared in an episode of Hidden in Plain Sight entitled "Deep Learning is Eating the World", where he discussed software evolution and the effect of machine learning on humanity.

References 

American technology chief executives
Living people
1981 births
Stanford University alumni
American computer programmers
Businesspeople from Boston